Rhodes Center was Atlanta's first shopping center. It was built in 1937 by architects Ivey and Crook and was one of the largest real estate developments in
Atlanta during the Depression.

History
It was located in Midtown between Peachtree Street and Spring Street. It consisted of one-story buildings that ran along the north, west and south sides of Rhodes Hall. The buildings were faced with Georgia white marble. 

Today only the south building remains along with the single-block street named "South Rhodes Center NW". The offramp of the Buford Highway Connector to Peachtree Street runs along the building's south side. The site of the west building is now parking behind Rhodes Hall. The site of the north building is now occupied by part of the 1550 Peachtree building and the plaza in front of 1550 Peachtree.

In 2003, Dewberry Capital promoted the redevelopment of the south building, however as of 2011 this redevelopment had not taken place. Dewberry has acquired numerous properties in the area, historically known as Pershing Point but which Dewberry proposes to call "Uptown Atlanta". The properties include one at the northwest corner of Peachtree and 17th, Campanile at Peachtree & 14th, Peachtree Pointe at Spring and Peachtree, and the site for the proposed 13-story Dewberry Ansley tower.

Tenants
A 1938 directory shows the following tenants:
 The air-conditioned Rhodes Theatre
 A&P superstore
 Anderson & McGee beauty salon
 Ann Hagan gift shop
 Calhoun radio service co.
 Dutch Oven bakery
 Georgia Milk Producers store
 May Air restaurant
 National Grain Yeast Corp.
 Oasis liquor store
 Rhodes Center florists
 Rhodes 5c and 10c store
 Roland's liquor store
 Waldrep and Griffin druggists
 Yellow Lantern library
 Dr. Zeigler clinic

See also
Rhodes Hall

References

External links
 "Rhodes Center", Dewberry Capital
 "Ivey and Crook", New Georgia Encyclopedia

Buildings and structures in Fulton County, Georgia
Defunct shopping malls in the United States
Ivey and Crook buildings
Shopping malls established in 1937
Buildings and structures in Atlanta
Shopping malls in the Atlanta metropolitan area
1937 establishments in Georgia (U.S. state)